Emmelia of Caesarea was born in Cappadocia, a province of the Roman Empire (nowadays Central Anatolia, Turkey). She died on 30 May 375 AD. She was born in the late third to early fourth century, a period in time when Christianity was becoming more widespread, posing a challenge to the Roman government and its pagan rule. 
She was the wife of Basil the Elder and bore nine or ten children, including Basil of Caesarea (born circa 330), Macrina the Younger, Peter of Sebaste, Gregory of Nyssa, and Naucratius.

Emmelia—also known as Emilia or Emily—is venerated as a saint in both the Eastern Orthodox Church and the Roman Catholic Church and is said to have died on 30 May 375. However, she is not the only woman in her family to be venerated as a saint. Both her mother-in-law, Macrina the Elder, as well as her daughters, Macrina the Younger and Theosebia are recognized as saints in the Catholic Church (except for Theosebia) and Eastern Orthodox Church.

Emmelia spent much of her later years living with her eldest daughter, Macrina the Younger. Macrina the Younger had a profound impact on her mother. With her husband no longer around, Emmelia and her daughter lived a life dedicated to Christianity, surrounded by servants whom they treated as equals, at Macrina the Younger's insistence. Their ascetic way of life attracted a following of women which created a convent-like atmosphere, where one was considered rich if she lived a pure and devout Christian life and disregarded the materialistic lure of earthly pleasures and possessions.

References

Byzantine female saints
Saints from Roman Anatolia
4th-century Christian saints
Year of birth unknown
375 deaths
Late Ancient Christian female saints
4th-century Byzantine women
Byzantine saints
People from Kayseri